NHL FaceOff '97 is a video game developed by American studio Killergames and published by Sony Interactive Entertainment for the PlayStation. It is the second game in the NHL FaceOff series.

Gameplay
NHL FaceOff '97 includes new features like tournament modes, and new strategy settings.

Reception
Reviews for NHL FaceOff '97 were highly positive. Critics generally remarked that while the sprite-based graphics are dated, the gameplay design, especially the new icon-based passing, make the game superior to other hockey games for the PlayStation. An exception was Hugh Sterbakov of GameSpot, who also praised the icon-based passing but said it was generally the control configuration and sound effects which held the game back, and the graphics which made it still worthwhile. He scored it a 7.9 out of 10. Air Hendrix of GamePro found the icon-based passing gave NHL FaceOff '97 a strategic depth not found in any previous hockey game, and assessed that "Novices and pros alike will find fun, ferocious gameplay and a challenge that doesn't fade." A Next Generation critic concluded, "Overall, NHL Face Off '97 is a great effort, and the quick, easy to get into gameplay makes running through a full season fun again, something that's been missing for far too long." He scored it four out of five stars. The two sports reviewers of Electronic Gaming Monthly gave it a 9.25 out of 10, with Joe Rybicki stating "It's quite simple to pick up, but difficult to master, qualities of some of the best games of all time."

Reviews
LeveL #26 (03/1997)
Game Revolution - Jun 04, 2004
Official UK PlayStation Magazine - 1997

References

1996 video games
NHL FaceOff
PlayStation (console) games
PlayStation (console)-only games
Video games developed in the United States